Aselizumab is an immunosuppressive drug which has been investigated for the use in severely injured patients. It binds to CD62L.

References 

Monoclonal antibodies